Tycomarptes is a genus of moths of the family Noctuidae. It was described by David Stephen Fletcher in 1961.

References

Hadeninae